The Securities Commission Malaysia is a Malaysian statutory body with responsibility for development and regulation of capital markets in the country. It is located in Bukit Kiara near the National Science Centre of Kuala Lumpur.

History
On March 1 1993, the Securities Commission Malaysia was established as a self-funded statutory body. The body functions to serve as the authority in developing and maintenance of a secure, efficient and orderly operations of the capital markets in Malaysia. It is a regulator and enforces its regulations to ensure the growth of capital market activities and market institutions within the financial sector.

Joint initiatives
In 2009 the commission and the Central Bank of Malaysia established the Asian Institute of Finance. They also established the Finance Accreditation Agency in 2013.

With Bursa Malaysia, they introduced Electronic Share Payment for e-payment of stock market transactions, and e-Dividend; both were announced in the 2010 budget.

See also
 Asset management in Malaysia
 BIX Malaysia
 Securities Commission

References

External links
 Securities Commission Malaysia official website

Federal ministries, departments and agencies of Malaysia
1993 establishments in Malaysia
Government agencies established in 1993
Malaysia
Ministry of Finance (Malaysia)
Financial regulatory authorities of Malaysia